MisterWives is an American indie pop band based in New York City, consisting of lead singer Mandy Lee (Amanda Lee Duffy), percussionist Etienne Bowler, bass guitarist  William Hehir, guitarist Marc Campbell, and saxophonist Mike Murphy. MisterWives have played with acts such as Panic! at the Disco, Twenty One Pilots, Half Moon Run, Bleachers, The Mowgli's, Walk the Moon, Foster the People, Paramore, American Authors, X Ambassadors, and Lawrence. The band's debut album Our Own House was released in January 2015, and subsequently met with critical acclaim.

History

Formation
MisterWives was formed in late 2012 when lead singer Mandy Lee wanted an 80s cover band for her birthday party. She partnered with fellow musicians Etienne Bowler and William Hehir. Lee met Hehir through a mutual friend, and was introduced to Bowler a short time later. At the time, the two had been working at restaurants just a block apart in Manhattan. Eventually the band would expand to its current set-up of five members by bringing Bowler's friends Blum and Campbell (not including the band's saxophonist Mike Murphy), and play its first show as 'MisterWives' (a gender-flipped play on the term, sister wives, suggesting polyandry as opposed to polygyny) on February 1, 2013 at the Canal Room in New York City.

Early career
The day after playing the Canal Room, the band was signed to Photo Finish Records. They would spend the better part of that year on tour and making their first EP. The group began touring with Half Moon Run in October 2013 that ended with a performance at the CMJ Music Marathon. This was shortly followed by a six-week tour with American Authors and The Royal Concept. All the while, the group prepared songs for their debut EP, Reflections.

On December 24, 2013, MisterWives released a trap remix of "Coffins" with the Pegboard Nerds under Monstercat.

Reflections EP
The band released Reflections on January 7, 2014. The EP has 6 songs, including the title track, which was iTunes' free Single of the Week for the week of January 6. Music Engineer Neal Avron was brought in to mix the EP while Frequency produced "Reflections". The EP was met with rave reviews and has sold over 20,000 copies. Alter the Press' Victoria Mier gave the album a 5/5 saying "Simply put, MisterWives is quite incredible and certainly has both the capacity and the talent to take over the indie-pop world."  Nick Krenn of EarBuddy.net wrote "All listeners hunting for more depth from current pop music will want to hear Reflections". The music blog Pigeons and Planes said about one of the tracks from the EP: "MisterWives has only been in existence since 2012, but you would never know that by listening to the expertly written and masterfully produced "Coffins". Reflections sold over 6,000 copies by the end of 2014.

In July 2014, "Vagabond" was made the opening theme of the MTV Teen Drama Finding Carter. Then the band opened for Twenty One Pilots as part of the "Vessel" tour. They would later go on to open for them again on the Banditø world tour.
They saw more notoriety in the media, being boasted by MTV Buzzworthy as the "next golden children of pop". The band also performed on VH1's Big Morning Buzz and ABC's Jimmy Kimmel Live.

Our Own House
In January 2015, the group announced a February 24 release date for their debut album, Our Own House. The reveal coincided with the announcement of their 2015 tour of the same name. In February of that year, the band was featured in Kia Motors' web series Rediscovered, as they covered the Hall & Oates song "Out of Touch" before John Oates made a surprise visit in the studio. Misterwives performed at the 2015 edition of Boston Calling Music Festival, as well as many other major music festivals including Lollapalooza, Outside Lands, Hangout Fest, LouFest, and Austin City Limits. They then embarked on their "Scrapbook Tour", to critical acclaim, with one critic going as far as calling them the "best live band in America".

Connect the Dots and Superbloom 
On December 17, 2016, the band posted on its official Facebook page to announce: "our second record is finally complete". On February 14, 2017, MisterWives announced via Facebook that their new single, "Machine", from their second album, would be available on February 17. On February 24, MisterWives announced via their Twitter page that the album, entitled Connect the Dots, would be released on May 19. From February 24 to April 15, 2017, MisterWives toured with Panic! At the Disco on their Death of a Bachelor Tour.

Then they had a summer "Misterwives Band Camp Tour" through June and ended July 1 in Denver. They also released two singles: "Oh Love" on March 30, 2017 and "Drummer Boy" on April 20, 2017, via their YouTube channel in accordance with Vevo. And on September 21, they began their 'Connect the Dots' tour with bands Vinyl Theatre and Smallpools, which ran until April, 2018.

MisterWives toured the remainder of April and into May through their Let The Light In tour. Then they toured with Thirty Seconds To Mars alongside WALK THE MOON and Joywave on the Monolith Tour, from June to July. The band played festivals throughout the rest of the year, where Lee and Bowler were wedded in August, and began work on their third studio album in early 2019.

On July 30, 2019, the band posted the video for their single "whywhywhy". This was their first release after being signed to Fueled By Ramen. The band announced their "No Place Like Home Tour" which began in November 2019. On November 8, 2019, the band released an EP titled Mini Bloom, which included 5 new songs.

On May 18, 2020, the band posted on Instagram that Lee and Bowler had separated, but that the band would stay together and continue to make music and tour. The full 19-song album Superbloom, which included tracks from the previous EP, was released on July 24, 2020.

On December 12, 2020, the band gave a special performance of Superbloom presented on Moment House entitled SUPERBLOOM: The Live Dream.

On August 31, 2021, the band announced the departure of Jesse Blum.

Later in 2021, Fueled by Ramen dropped MisterWives from their lineup, forcing the band to go independent again. They have since released several songs under their new independent imprint Resilient Little Records.

Discography

Studio albums

Extended plays

Singles

Notes

Members

Current members 
 Mandy Lee - lead vocals
 William Hehir - bass, backing vocals
 Marc Campbell - guitar 
 Etienne Bowler - drums, percussion 
 Mike Murphy - keyboards

Former members 
 Jesse Blum - trumpet, keyboards

References

External links
 

2012 establishments in New York (state)
Alternative rock groups from New York (state)
Fueled by Ramen artists
Indie pop groups from New York (state)
Musical groups established in 2012
Photo Finish Records artists